Stigmella monella is a moth of the family Nepticulidae. It is found in the Russian Far East, Japan (Hokkaido) and probably north-eastern China.

There are probably at least two generations per year.

External links
Nepticulidae and Opostegidae of the world
Japanese Species Of The Genus Stigmella (Nepticulidae: Lepidoptera)

Nepticulidae
Moths of Asia
Moths described in 1984